Oostende (M940) is the first ship in the s. She is being constructed in France for the Belgian Navy.

History
Oostende is the result of a joint procurement programme for the replacements of the Tripartite- / Alkmaar-class minehunters for the Belgian- and Dutch navies.

She was laid down at Piriou, Concarneau, France on 30 November 2021. On 19 December 2022, she got out of the construction hangar and work on masts, paintings and furniture began. She is planned to be commissioned in December 2024.

References

Mine warfare vessel classes
Minehunters of Belgium